William P. Graves was an American college football coach. He was hired as head football coach at the University of North Carolina at Chapel Hill when the team resumed playing at the beginning of 1891. Although there was a game scheduled for February 14, 1891 at Wake Forest, it was canceled.

Head coaching record

References

Year of birth missing
Year of death missing
North Carolina Tar Heels football coaches